"Thousand" is a song by American electronica musician Moby. It was released as a double A-side single with Moby's song "I Feel It" in the United states, serving as the fourth and final single released from his self-titled debut album.

"Thousand" was listed in Guinness World Records for having the fastest tempo in beats-per-minute (BPM) of any released single, peaking at approximately 1,015 BPM.

Track listing

Charts

References

External links 
 

1993 singles
1992 songs
Moby songs
Songs written by Moby
Instinct Records singles